Rodolfo Arizaga (July 11, 1926 – May 12, 1985) was an Argentine composer.

Arizaga was born in Buenos Aires, where he studied composition at the National Conservatory under Alberto Williams, José Gil, Luis Gianneo, and Teodoro Fuchs; he also studied philosophy at the National University. After touring Spain in 1950, he went to Paris in 1954 and studied under Nadia Boulanger and Olivier Messiaen. Here, he also began experimenting with the Ondes Martenot, and composed several works for the instrument. Returning to Argentina in 1960, he taught at Buenos Aires University and worked as music critic for journals and newspapers. He died in Escobar, Greater Buenos Aires.

Works
Poema de invierno for violin and piano, 1944
Sonatina for piano, 1944–45
Jaquinot, Ballet, 1945
Dos corales, 1945
Suite para piano, 1945
Sonata for piano, 1946
Toccata for piano, 1947
Pequeño vals en tono gris, 1948
Sonatina for piano, 1948
Bailable Real for orchestra, 1948
Délires, Cantata, 1954–57; rev. 1970
Serranillas de la infanzona for piano, 1957
Sonata Breve for piano and Ondes Martenot, 1958
El organillo for Ondes Martenot, 1958
Piezas epigramáticas for piano, 1961
Prometeo 45, Poema Dramático, 1962
Concierto para piano, 1963
Tientos para Santa María, 1965
Música para Cristóbal Colón for orchestra, 1968
String Quartet No. 1, 1968
Ciaccona for viola solo, 1969
El ombligo de los limbos, la momia y una encuesta, 1969
String Quartet No. 2

Writings 
Manuel de Falla, 1961
Juan José Castro, 1963
Enciclopedia de la Música Argentina, 1971
R. Arizaga, Pompeyo Camps, Historia de la Música en la Argentina, 1990,

External links 
 Mr Rodolfo Arizaga UNESCO Knowledge Portal
  Roberto Espinosa: Rodolfo Arizaga: El sonido por el sonido mismo. mundoclasico.com
  Arizaga, Rodolfo (1926-1985). Grupo de pesquisa em práticas interpretativas

1926 births
1985 deaths
People from Buenos Aires
Argentine classical composers
20th-century classical composers
Argentine music educators
Male classical composers
20th-century male musicians